Union Live is a live album and video by English progressive rock band Yes, released in January 2011 on Voiceprint Records. It was originally released in three versions; a single DVD, a double CD, and a limited edition double CD and DVD set. The album and video were recorded in 1991 during their Union Tour, staged in support of their studio album Union (1991) and featured the group's eight-member formation.

The single DVD and double CD was recorded on 8 August 1991 at the Shoreline Amphitheatre in Mountain View, California. The limited edition set features additional content, including audience shot video of the 9 April and 9 May 1991 shows in Pensacola, Florida, and Denver, Colorado, respectively, plus audio tracks from shows in London and Burgettstown, Pennsylvania.

In 2021 Gonzo Multimedia re-released the concert as a double CD and DVD Set under the title Union 30 Live - Shoreline Amphiteatre - California (August 8, 1991).

Track listing

CD
Live at the Shoreline Amphitheatre, Mountain View, California on 8 August 1991.

DVD
Live at the Shoreline Amphitheatre, Mountain View, California on 8 August 1991.

Limited edition bonus DVD
Live at the Pensacola Civic Center, Pensacola, Florida on 9 April 1991.

Bootleg videos from Denver, Colorado, McNichols Sports Arena (aka Big Mac), May 9, 1991
Firebird Suite / Yours Is No Disgrace
Rhythm of Love
Shock to the System
Heart of the Sunrise
Clap / Mood for a Day
Make it Easy / Owner of a Lonely Heart
And You And I
Drum Duet
Hold On
I've Seen All Good People
Kaye solo / Changes
Solly's Beard
Long Distance Runaround
Whitefish / Amazing Grace
Lift Me Up
Wakeman solo
Awaken
Roundabout

Bonus audio 5.1 mixes
Shoreline Amphitheatre, Mountain View, California in the San Francisco Bay Area, August 8, 1991.
Shock to the System
And You And I
Lift Me Up

Bonus audio stereo tracks
Shock to the System
And You And I Above two tracks from London – Wembley Arena, June 29, 1991.
Drum Duet
Changes Above two tracks from Burgettstown, Pennsylvania, Star Lake Amphitheater, July 24, 1991.

Personnel
Jon Anderson – lead vocals, acoustic guitar, tambourine
Steve Howe – guitar, backing vocals
Trevor Rabin –  guitar, lead vocals, backing vocals
Tony Kaye – Hammond Organ, keyboards, sound effects
Rick Wakeman – keyboards, synthesisers, percussion on "Your Move"
Chris Squire –  bass, backing vocals
Alan White – acoustic drums, percussion
Bill Bruford – electronic drums, percussion

References

External links
YesWorld – Official Yes Website
YesUnionDVD.com – Official website of the DVD & album

Yes (band) video albums
2011 video albums
Live video albums
2011 live albums
Albums with cover art by Roger Dean (artist)